Benjamin Milam Barnes, Jr. (January 1, 1934 – August 8, 1985) was an American country music singer, songwriter, and guitarist. He is best known for his 1956 hit "Poor Man's Riches".

Biography
Barnes was born January 1, 1934, in Beaumont, Texas. He first played ukulele, and then guitar, in his childhood, and entered various talent shows in Beaumont in his teens. He then befriended George Jones, who also mentored him and had him play rhythm guitar in his road band. At a recording session with Jones in Gold Star Studios in 1955, Barnes was encouraged by Starday Records owner and record producer Pappy Daily to audition as an artist. His first Starday release, "Once Again", was issued in 1956. Following three more unsuccessful releases, he issued "Poor Man's Riches" in August 1956, which went to No. 2 on the Billboard country charts. Although later recordings were unsuccessful, Barnes appeared on the Louisiana Hayride and continued to record for various other labels throughout his career. His second chart entry came in 1961 on Mercury Records with "Yearning". At this point, Barnes also operated a tavern in Beaumont. Barnes continued to record until shortly before his death in 1985. Bear Family Records issued a compilation titled Benny Barnes: The Complete 1950s Recordings in 2007.

Discography

References

1934 births
1985 deaths
American male singer-songwriters
American country singer-songwriters
American country guitarists
American male guitarists
People from Beaumont, Texas
Country musicians from Texas
Mercury Records artists
Starday Records artists
20th-century American guitarists
20th-century American singers
Singer-songwriters from Texas
Guitarists from Texas
20th-century American male singers

de:Benny Barnes